Didymoplexiopsis is a genus of plants in the Orchidaceae. The genus contains only one species, Didymoplexiopsis khiriwongensis, native to Hainan, Vietnam, Laos and Thailand.

References

External links
IOSPE orchid photos, Didymoplexiopsis khiriwongensis 

Orchids of China
Orchids of Laos
Orchids of Vietnam
Orchids of Thailand
Monotypic Epidendroideae genera
Gastrodieae genera
Gastrodieae